The 1882 season was the first for the Alleghenys, later known as the Pittsburgh Pirates. They finished at exactly a .500 record, 39 wins and 39 losses, good for fourth place in the new American Association.

The team played its home games in Allegheny City, across the Allegheny River from Pittsburgh. Chartered as the Allegheny Base Ball Club of Pittsburgh, the team appeared as "Allegheny" in the standings and was often referred to in the plural as the Alleghenys. The club was not related to the earlier Alleghenys of the International Association.

Game log

|- bgcolor="ccffcc"
| 1 || May 2 || @ Red Stockings || 10–9 ||  ||  || — || — || 1–0
|- bgcolor="ffbbbb"
| 2 || May 3 || @ Red Stockings || 3–7 ||  ||  || — || — || 1–1
|- bgcolor="ffbbbb"
| 3 || May 4 || @ Red Stockings || 10–19 ||  ||  || — || — || 1–2
|- bgcolor="ccffcc"
| 4 || May 8 || @ Red Stockings || 2–0 ||  ||  || — || — || 2–2
|- bgcolor="ccffcc"
| 5 || May 10 || Brown Stockings || 9–5 ||  ||  || — || — || 3–2
|- bgcolor="ffbbbb"
| 6 || May 16 || @ Red Stockings || 4–9 ||  ||  || — || — || 3–3
|- bgcolor="ffbbbb"
| 7 || May 18 || Red Stockings || 2–3 ||  ||  || — || — || 3–4
|- bgcolor="ccffcc"
| 8 || May 19 || Red Stockings || 8–7 ||  ||  || — || — || 4–4
|- bgcolor="ccffcc"
| 9 || May 20 || Red Stockings || 5–3 ||  ||  || — || — || 5–4
|- bgcolor="ffbbbb"
| 10 || May 29 || Eclipse || 7–15 ||  ||  || — || — || 5–5
|- bgcolor="ccffcc"
| 11 || May 30 || Eclipse || 10–8 ||  ||  || — || — || 6–5
|-

|- bgcolor="ccffcc"
| 12 || June 1 || Brown Stockings || 11–4 ||  ||  || — || — || 7–5
|- bgcolor="ffbbbb"
| 13 || June 4 || @ Brown Stockings || 3–7 ||  ||  || — || — || 7–6
|- bgcolor="ccffcc"
| 14 || June 6 || @ Brown Stockings || 15–6 ||  ||  || — || — || 8–6
|- bgcolor="ffbbbb"
| 15 || June 8 || @ Brown Stockings || 5–6 ||  ||  || — || — || 8–7
|- bgcolor="ccffcc"
| 16 || June 10 || @ Brown Stockings || 9–3 ||  ||  || — || — || 9–7
|- bgcolor="ffbbbb"
| 17 || June 12 || @ Eclipse || 4–8 ||  ||  || — || — || 9–8
|- bgcolor="ffbbbb"
| 18 || June 15 || @ Eclipse || 0–5 ||  ||  || — || — || 9–9
|- bgcolor="ffbbbb"
| 19 || June 17 || @ Eclipse || 0–10 ||  ||  || — || — || 9–10
|- bgcolor="ffbbbb"
| 20 || June 20 || @ Red Stockings || 1–6 ||  ||  || — || — || 9–11
|- bgcolor="ffbbbb"
| 21 || June 22 || @ Red Stockings || 2–5 ||  ||  || — || — || 9–12
|- bgcolor="ccffcc"
| 22 || June 23 || @ Red Stockings || 8–5 ||  ||  || — || — || 10–12
|- bgcolor="ffbbbb"
| 23 || June 24 || @ Red Stockings || 4–21 ||  ||  || — || — || 10–13
|- bgcolor="ffbbbb"
| 24 || June 27 || Athletics || 4–6 ||  ||  || — || — || 10–14
|- bgcolor="ccffcc"
| 25 || June 29 || Athletics || 11–1 ||  ||  || — || — || 11–14
|- bgcolor="ffbbbb"
| 26 || June 30 || Athletics || 1–7 ||  ||  || — || — || 11–15
|-

|- bgcolor="ffbbbb"
| 27 || July 1 || Athletics || 6–8 ||  ||  || — || — || 11–16
|- bgcolor="ccffcc"
| 28 || July 4 || @ Brown Stockings || 6–5 ||  ||  || — || — || 12–16
|- bgcolor="ffbbbb"
| 29 || July 6 || Orioles || 8–9 ||  ||  || — || — || 12–17
|- bgcolor="ffbbbb"
| 30 || July 7 || Orioles || 6–8 ||  ||  || — || — || 12–18
|- bgcolor="ccffcc"
| 31 || July 10 || Orioles || 11–0 ||  ||  || — || — || 13–18
|- bgcolor="ccffcc"
| 32 || July 11 || Brown Stockings || 6–1 ||  ||  || — || — || 14–18
|- bgcolor="ccffcc"
| 33 || July 12 || Brown Stockings || 6–1 ||  ||  || — || — || 15–18
|- bgcolor="ffbbbb"
| 34 || July 13 || Brown Stockings || 1–3 ||  ||  || — || — || 15–19
|- bgcolor="ccffcc"
| 35 || July 15 || Brown Stockings || 10–1 ||  ||  || — || — || 16–19
|- bgcolor="ffbbbb"
| 36 || July 19 || Red Stockings || 6–12 ||  ||  || — || — || 16–20
|- bgcolor="ccffcc"
| 37 || July 20 || Red Stockings || 3–2 ||  ||  || — || — || 17–20
|- bgcolor="ffbbbb"
| 38 || July 21 || Red Stockings || 0–2 ||  ||  || — || — || 17–21
|- bgcolor="ffbbbb"
| 39 || July 22 || Red Stockings || 2–3 ||  ||  || — || — || 17–22
|- bgcolor="ffbbbb"
| 40 || July 27 || @ Orioles || 2–3 ||  ||  || — || — || 17–23
|- bgcolor="ccffcc"
| 41 || July 31 || @ Orioles || 5–1 ||  ||  || — || — || 18–23
|-

|- bgcolor="ccffcc"
| 42 || August 1 || @ Athletics || 3–2 ||  ||  || — || — || 19–23
|- bgcolor="ccffcc"
| 43 || August 3 || @ Athletics || 3–2 ||  ||  || — || — || 20–23
|- bgcolor="ffbbbb"
| 44 || August 4 || @ Athletics || 2–4 ||  ||  || — || — || 20–24
|- bgcolor="ccffcc"
| 45 || August 5 || @ Athletics || 6–5 ||  ||  || — || — || 21–24
|- bgcolor="ffbbbb"
| 46 || August 9 || Orioles || 5–8 ||  ||  || — || — || 21–25
|- bgcolor="ffbbbb"
| 47 || August 10 || Orioles || 5–10 ||  ||  || — || — || 21–26
|- bgcolor="ffbbbb"
| 48 || August 11 || Orioles || 0–1 ||  ||  || — || — || 21–27
|- bgcolor="ffbbbb"
| 49 || August 12 || Orioles || 7–8 ||  ||  || — || — || 21–28
|- bgcolor="ccffcc"
| 50 || August 14 || Orioles || 14–1 ||  ||  || — || — || 22–28
|- bgcolor="ffbbbb"
| 51 || August 16 || @ Eclipse || 1–3 ||  ||  || — || — || 22–29
|- bgcolor="ffbbbb"
| 52 || August 17 || @ Eclipse || 2–3 ||  ||  || — || — || 22–30
|- bgcolor="ccffcc"
| 53 || August 18 || @ Eclipse || 8–4 ||  ||  || — || — || 23–30
|- bgcolor="ccffcc"
| 54 || August 19 || @ Eclipse || 6–4 ||  ||  || — || — || 24–30
|- bgcolor="ccffcc"
| 55 || August 20 || @ Eclipse || 3–1 ||  ||  || — || — || 25–30
|- bgcolor="ffbbbb"
| 56 || August 22 || @ Brown Stockings || 6–7 ||  ||  || — || — || 25–31
|- bgcolor="ccffcc"
| 57 || August 23 || @ Brown Stockings || 10–3 ||  ||  || — || — || 26–31
|- bgcolor="ccffcc"
| 58 || August 24 || @ Brown Stockings || 7–2 ||  ||  || — || — || 27–31
|- bgcolor="ffbbbb"
| 59 || August 26 || @ Brown Stockings || 1–4 ||  ||  || — || — || 27–32
|- bgcolor="ffbbbb"
| 60 || August 27 || @ Brown Stockings || 2–3 ||  ||  || — || — || 27–33
|- bgcolor="ccffcc"
| 61 || August 29 || Athletics || 2–1 ||  ||  || — || — || 28–33
|- bgcolor="ccffcc"
| 62 || August 30 || Athletics || 4–1 ||  ||  || — || — || 29–33
|- bgcolor="ffbbbb"
| 63 || August 31 || Athletics || 2–4 ||  ||  || — || — || 29–34
|-

|- bgcolor="ccffcc"
| 64 || September 1 || Athletics || 4–3 ||  ||  || — || — || 30–34
|- bgcolor="ccffcc"
| 65 || September 5 || @ Orioles || 3–1 ||  ||  || — || — || 31–34
|- bgcolor="ccffcc"
| 66 || September 6 || @ Orioles || 14–7 ||  ||  || — || — || 32–34
|- bgcolor="ccffcc"
| 67 || September 7 || @ Orioles || 7–5 ||  ||  || — || — || 33–34
|- bgcolor="ccffcc"
| 68 || September 8 || @ Orioles || 8–2 ||  ||  || — || — || 34–34
|- bgcolor="ffffff"
| 69 || September 9 || @ Orioles || 7–7 ||  ||  || — || — || 34–34
|- bgcolor="ccffcc"
| 70 || September 12 || @ Athletics || 8–6 ||  ||  || — || — || 35–34
|- bgcolor="ccffcc"
| 71 || September 14 || @ Athletics || 13–1 ||  ||  || — || — || 36–34
|- bgcolor="ffbbbb"
| 72 || September 15 || @ Athletics || 6–10 ||  ||  || — || — || 36–35
|- bgcolor="ccffcc"
| 73 || September 16 || @ Athletics || 6–3 ||  ||  || — || — || 37–35
|- bgcolor="ffbbbb"
| 74 || September 18 || Eclipse || 3–5 ||  ||  || — || — || 37–36
|- bgcolor="ffbbbb"
| 75 || September 19 || Eclipse || 1–3 ||  ||  || — || — || 37–37
|- bgcolor="ccffcc"
| 76 || September 21 || Eclipse || 6–4 ||  ||  || — || — || 38–37
|- bgcolor="ffbbbb"
| 77 || September 22 || Eclipse || 6–20 ||  ||  || — || — || 38–38
|- bgcolor="ffbbbb"
| 78 || September 23 || Eclipse || 3–13 ||  ||  || — || — || 38–39
|- bgcolor="ccffcc"
| 79 || September 23 || Eclipse || 7–1 ||  ||  || — || — || 39–39
|-

|-
| Legend:       = Win       = Loss       = TieBold = Pittsburgh Alleghenys team member

Season standings

Record vs. opponents

Detailed records

Roster

Player stats 
Batters
Note: G = Games played; AB = At bats; H = Hits; Avg. = Batting average; HR = Home runs; RBI = Runs batted in

Pitchers
Note: G = Games pitched; IP = Innings pitched; W = Wins; L = Losses; ERA = Earned run average; SO = Strikeouts

Transactions
June 1882 – released Morrie Critchley
June 1882 – released Jake Goodman
July 1882 – released Harry Arundel
July 1882 – released Charlie Morton

References

Pittsburgh Pirates seasons
Pittsburgh Alleghenys season
Pittsburg Pir